The Price of a Good Time is a 1917 American silent drama film directed by Lois Weber and Phillips Smalley and starring teen Mildred Harris. It is currently considered a lost film.

Cast
Mildred Harris as Linnie
Anne Schaefer as Her Mother
Helene Rosson as Molly
Kenneth Harlan as Preston Winfield
Alfred Allen as His Father
Adele Farrington as His Mother
Gertrude Astor as Miss Schyler

Advertisements

References

External links

Still portrait on the set (University of Washington, Sayre collection)

1917 films
Lost American films
Films directed by Lois Weber
1917 drama films
Universal Pictures films
American silent feature films
American black-and-white films
Silent American drama films
1917 lost films
Lost drama films
1910s American films
1910s English-language films
English-language drama films